Hannah Roberson-Mytilinaiou (born 30 April 1967) is a Greek equestrian. She competed in two events at the 2004 Summer Olympics.

References

External links
 

1967 births
Living people
Greek female equestrians
Olympic equestrians of Greece
Equestrians at the 2004 Summer Olympics
Sportspeople from Athens